2-oxoglutaramate amidase (omega-amidase) is an enzyme with systematic name 5-amino-2,5-dioxopentanoate amidohydrolase. This enzyme catalyses the following chemical reaction

 2-oxoglutaramate + H2O  2-oxoglutarate + ammonia

The enzyme participates in the nicotine degradation pathway of several Gram-positive bacteria.

References

External links 
 

EC 3.5.1